Beneath the Valley of the Ultra-Vixens is a 1979 satirical sexploitation film directed by American film-maker Russ Meyer and written by Roger Ebert and Meyer. It stars Kitten Natividad and Ann Marie with a cameo by Uschi Digard.

Plot
The movie starts with introductions to the people of Small Town, U.S.A. Among them are the huge-breasted evangelical radio preacher Eufaula Roop (Ann Marie) who mounts Martin Bormann inside a coffin; a salesman who cunnilinguates a large-breasted housewife (Candy Samples); and the very large, black Junkyard Sal (June Mack) who has sex with her working-class employees. Finally there is Lamar, who anally rapes his large-breasted wife Lavonia (Kitten Natividad) after she tries having vaginal sex. Afterwards, she kicks him in the groin.

While Lamar heads off to his junkyard work, Lavonia spots a young man skinny dipping in a lake. She sneaks off and undresses, then jumps the boy from behind and proceeds to mount and rape him. The young man soon escapes, but she dives down, catches him underwater by fellating him and then overpowers him. After he succumbs to her, she learns his name is Rhett and that he is fourteen. Later on, the aforementioned salesman comes to her home and she ends up having sex with him too.

Meanwhile, Lamar, who previously turned down Junkyard Sal's invitation for sex, gets called to her office where she meets him in her underwear. She locks him inside and threatens to fire him if he does not succumb to her. Lamar, who we are told needs money for correspondent school, lies down on her bed. She forces herself on him in numerous sexual positions. After a while, she lets Lamar have anal sex with her and gives in when a suddenly enthusiastic Lamar stops her from continuing into other positions. Lamar then spots fellow employees peeping from the window. He breaks open the door and beats them up. Junkyard Sal then fires the peepers and Lamar for being "perverts".

Lamar goes to a bar, where Lavonia masks herself as Mexican stripper Lola Langusta and drugs his drink. In a motel room, Lavonia rapes the unconscious Lamar — by first triggering an erection via fellation, and then by finally having vaginal sex with him using a sock as contraception. She frees him to test if she changed his ways, but he runs away. Back home, Lavonia has sex with a truck driver. As she checks the clock smiling, Lamar returns. A fight ensues and Lavonia helps Lamar by burning the truck driver's scrotum with a light bulb.

Lamar takes Lavonia and himself into dentist/marriage counselor Asa Lavender (Robert Pearson). After the dentist takes Lavonia to the dental room, his nurse Flovilla kisses Lamar. As the dentist hurts Lavonia's teeth and she counters by grabbing his crotch painfully, Lamar rapes the nurse. The doctor then switches places with the nurse. When seeing Lamar still has his pants down, the doctor tries to rape him, but Lamar hides in the closet. While the nurse and Lavonia have sex using the nurse's double-ended dildo, the doctor uses various weapons to force Lamar out of the closet. Lamar eventually beats the doctor up and interrupts Lavonia and the nurse. An arrangement of Stranger in Paradise is played in the background throughout the dentist scene.

Lamar decides his cure lies in faith. After dropping him off at the radio station (a power station), Lavonia goes home and has sex once again with the truck driver. Lamar takes his pants off in front of Eufaula Roop's booth and reveals an erection. She immediately goes off the air. When Lamar tells her he wants to be saved, she sends him to her cleansing room (a bathroom) while she changes clothes. Lamar lies inside a water-filled bathtub as a robe wearing Eufaula Roop stands above him and baptizes (and almost drowns) him. Suddenly she takes her robe off, sits down on him and rapes him, all the while preaching to her listeners about his salvation. Lamar heads off home, punches the truck driver and has sex with Lavonia.

After Eufaula Roop leans back on her chair and moans, the teen-aged Rhett climbs from under her desk and she takes him to the bathtub.

The narrator heads off to his own home, where the teen-aged Rhett, his son, has sex with the narrator's huge-breasted younger Austrian wife, SuperSoul (Uschi Digard), during an earthquake.

Cast
 Kitten Natividad as Lavonia; Lola Langusta
 Anne Marie as Eufaula Roop
 Ken Kerr as Lamar Shedd
 June Mack as Junk Yard Sal
 Lola Langusta as Stripper
 Patrick Wright as Mr Peterbuilt
 Michael E. Finn as Semper Fidelis
 Steve Tracy as Rhett
 Sharon Hill as Flovilla Thatch
 Henry Rowland as Martin Bormann
 Robert E Pearson as Dr Asa Lavender
 DeForest Covan as Zebulon
 Don Scarbrough as Beau Badger
 Aram Katcher as Tyrone
 Uschi Digart as Supersoul
 Mary Gavin as Very Big Blonde
 Stuart Lancaster as man From Small Town Usa
 Russ Meyer as himself

Production
Meyer said the film was a spoof of Our Town.

The film was co-written by Roger Ebert who wanted to use a pseudonym.

Meyer made the film for $300,000. He said he kept the cost down by doing "everything to scale. You edit it yourself, you co-write it, you coscore it, you're your own cameraman, producer, director, and you cast the picture. You shoot it in the front room of your house. I bought a house that had a 28-foot ceiling, and we built the sets in the house, because it was scaled in such a way. I wanted to photograph it myself, because it was a kind of umbilical cord, to see what was happening before you said, "Print it"."

Meyer said a lot of the lines were looped. Natividad "because of the shit-kicker style, worked with Bob Easton, who is a very good dialect coach" and because June Mack "spoke without any trace of accent... we hired a girl who had formerly come from Mississippi to dub her voice."

Reception
Meyer said the film was his favourite because he was dating Natividad at the time. "We just did it in between," he recalled, "the very thing that I always said, 'No, Meyer, you shouldn't fool around, all those vital juices will be spread about.' But no, instead we just did it all the time. I mean, we shot inside, and we'd forgo lunch and have sex–wonderful, riotous, noisy sex… laughing and scratching. Yeah, that was fun. That really worked out wonderfully."

References

Bibliography

External links
 
 
 RM Films

1970s sex comedy films
Films directed by Russ Meyer
American sexploitation films
1979 films
American sex comedy films
1970s English-language films
Films with screenplays by Russ Meyer
Films with screenplays by Roger Ebert
1979 comedy films
Roger Ebert
Works by Roger Ebert
Siskel and Ebert
1970s American films